Agre is a surname. Notable people with the surname include:

 Alexandra Agre (born 1988), American curler
 Bernard Agré (1926–2014), Ivorian archbishop
 Denis Agre (born 1988), Bulgarian basketball player
 Ottar Agre, also known as Ottar E. Akre (1896–1992), Norwegian accordionist
 Peter Agre (born 1949), American physician
 Philip E. Agre
 Sardar Singh Agre, Indian politician

Agre is also the name of one of the dogs in the myth of Actaeon